Nu Capricorni or ν Capricorni is a binary star system in the southern constellation of Capricornus. It is visible to the naked eye with an apparent visual magnitude of +4.76.

Attributes
The star system is 6.6 degrees north of the ecliptic and so is within the margin of occultations of few if any planets but is well within that of the Moon. The celestial latitude of either of the Alpha Capricorni main stars is about 6.93 degrees by comparison. The system is calculated to be a distance of 253 light-years from the Sun based on parallax.

The two components are designated Nu Capricorni A and B. Component A is formally named Alshat , the traditional name for the system) 

The primary, component A, is a blue-white hued B-type main-sequence or subgiant star with an apparent magnitude of +4.77. Component B is a magnitude 11.8 star at an angular separation of 54.1 arcseconds from the primary.  Gaia Data Release 2 shows the companion to be much further away from Earth.

Nomenclature 

ν Capricorni, Latinised to Nu Capricorni, is the system's Bayer designation. The designations of the two components as Nu Capricorni A and B derive from the convention used by the Washington Multiplicity Catalog (WMC) for multiple star systems, and adopted by the International Astronomical Union (IAU).

The system bore the traditional name Alshat, from the Arabic الشاة aš-šā[t], meaning 'the sheep' that was to be slaughtered by the adjacent Beta¹ Capricorni (Dabih). In 2016, the IAU organized a Working Group on Star Names (WGSN) to catalog and standardize proper names for stars. The WGSN decided to attribute proper names to individual stars rather than entire multiple systems. It approved the name Alshat for the component Nu Capricorni A on 30 June 2017 and it is now so included in the List of IAU-approved Star Names.

References

B-type main-sequence stars
Binary stars
Alshat
Capricorni, Nu
Capricornus (constellation)
Durchmusterung objects
Capricorni, 08
193432
100310
7773